The 2014–15 Northern Football League season was the 117th in the history of Northern Football League, a football competition in England.

Division One

Division One featured 19 clubs which competed in the division last season, along with three new clubs, promoted from Division Two:
 Jarrow Roofing BCA
 North Shields
 West Allotment Celtic

League table

Promotion criteria
To be promoted at the end of the season a team must:
 Have applied to be considered for promotion by 30 November 2014
 Pass a ground grading examination by 31 March 2015
 Finish the season in a position higher than that of any other team also achieving criteria 1 and 2
 Finish the season in one of the top three positions

Only one club has achieved criterion 1:
 Bishop Auckland

Results

Stadia

Division Two

Division Two featured 18 clubs which competed in the division last season, along with four new clubs.
 Clubs relegated from Division One:
 Billingham Town
 Hebburn Town
 Team Northumbria
 Plus:
 Ryhope Colliery Welfare, promoted from the Northern Football Alliance

League table

Results

Stadif

References

External links
 Northern Football League official site

Northern Football League seasons
9